Xie Zhenhua (1916 – August 3, 2011) was a People's Liberation Army major general. He was born in Chongyi County, Jiangxi. He joined the Chinese Workers' and Peasants' Red Army in 1929 and the Chinese Communist Party in 1931. He fought against the Kuomintang in the Fifth Encirclement Campaign against Jiangxi Soviet during the Chinese Civil War. During the Second Sino-Japanese War, he was a member of the Eighth Route Army. He participated in the Huaihai Campaign, Shanghai Campaign and the Korean War. From 1971 to 1975, he was Communist Party Chief and Chairman of the Revolutionary Committee of Shanxi Province.

References

1916 births
2011 deaths
People's Liberation Army generals from Jiangxi
Governors of Shanxi
Members of the Central Advisory Commission
People from Chongyi County